Vaazhnthu Kaattugiren is a 1975 Indian Tamil language drama film directed by Krishnan–Panju and produced by S. S. Karuppusamy. The story was written by S. S. Thennarasu. The screenplay and dialogue were written by Mahendran. Music was composed by M. S. Viswanathan. The film stars Sujatha, R. Muthuraman, and Padmapriya, with Srikanth, M. N. Rajam, Manorama, and Suruli Rajan in supporting roles.

Plot

Cast 
 Sujatha as Geetha
 R. Muthuraman as Ramanathan
 Padmapriya as Pankajam
 Srikanth as Baskar or Subbha Rao
 M. N. Rajam as Ramanathan's mother
 Manorama as Dollak Sundari
 M. Bhanumathi as Lakshmi Baskar
 Suruli Rajan as Kumarappa
 Radhika as Vanaja
 Vijayachandrika as Rani
 S. Rama Rao (cameo appearance)
 Oru Viral Krishna Rao as Santhanam
 Sivagangai Sedhu Raman as Balaji
 Ennatha Kannaiya as Shanmugam

Soundtrack 
Music was composed by M. S. Viswanathan, and lyrics were written by Kannadasan.

References

External links 
 

1970s Tamil-language films
1975 drama films
1975 films
Films about women in India
Films directed by Krishnan–Panju
Films scored by M. S. Viswanathan
Films set in 1975
Films with screenplays by Mahendran (filmmaker)
Indian black-and-white films
Indian drama films